Somebody's Someone a 2006 album by Canadian singer Gil Grand
 "Somebody's Someone", a song by Lonestar on their 2004 album Let's Be Us Again